Italo Casini (born March 9, 1892, date of death unknown) was an Italian bobsledder who competed in the early 1930s. At the 1932 Winter Olympics in Lake Placid, New York, he finished fifth in the four-man event and sixth in the two-man event.

References
1932 bobsleigh two-man results
1932 bobsleigh four-man results

1892 births
Year of death missing
Italian male bobsledders
Olympic bobsledders of Italy
Bobsledders at the 1932 Winter Olympics